Lincoln Club, also known as Mechanics Temple, Independent Order of Mechanics of the Western Hemisphere, is a historic clubhouse  in Clinton Hill, Brooklyn, New York, New York. It was built between 1886 and 1889 and is a -story Queen Anne style masonry building.  It is built of Roman brick and rock-faced Lake Superior brownstone with smooth brownstone bands and terra cotta ornament.  It has a sunken basement and the front facade features four distinctive arches on the first floor and a 2-story oriel window.

It was listed on the National Register of Historic Places in 1983.

See also
List of New York City Designated Landmarks in Brooklyn
National Register of Historic Places listings in Kings County, New York

References

External links
Alpha District Grand Lodge #1 website

Clubhouses on the National Register of Historic Places in New York City
Clubhouses in Brooklyn
Queen Anne architecture in New York (state)
Cultural infrastructure completed in 1889
National Register of Historic Places in Brooklyn
New York City Designated Landmarks in Brooklyn